Battista Pallavicino (died 12 May 1466) was a Roman Catholic prelate who served as Bishop of Reggio Emilia (1444–1466).

Biography
On 19 October 1444, Battista Pallavicino was appointed during the papacy of Pope Eugene IV as Bishop of Reggio Emilia.

Pallavicino died suddenly on 12 May 1466 of apoplexy (brain hemorrhage). He was buried in the crypt of the cathedral.

Works

Battista Pallavicino was the author of a number of works:
Baptistae Marchionis Pallavicini Episcopi Regiensis Historia flendae Crucis, et funeris Domini nostri Jesu Christi, ad Eugenium IV S. P. Parma 1477.
Epistola ad Albertum Parisium Reipubl. Bonon. Cancellarium. Regii die 1 Decembris 1465.
Baptistae Pallavicini Epistola ad patruum suum, data in Siena l'anno 1443.
Ejusdem B. M. P. Fabula. It begins "Jam senior dura forte jacet leo". [twenty-eight poems in honor of the Blessed Virgin Mary]
B. Palavicini Ep. Regien. ad Pium II Pont. Max. Gratulatio cum pollicitatione liberali. It begins, "Maxime Christicolum recto quo bella jubente".
Baptistae Marchionis Pallavicini Episcopi Regien. Salutano cum deprecatione in Mariam gratia plenam ad illustrem atque inclytum D. Nicolaum Esten. It begins, "Virgo decus mundi", {in hexameters]. Regìi sexto Aprilis mcccclviiiI .

References

External links and additional sources

Forner, Fabio (2004). "Pio II e Battista Pallavicino, vescovo di Reggio nell'Emilia," in: Andrea Canova (ed.), Rhegii Lingobardiae. Studi sulla cultura a Reggio Emilia in età umanistica (Reggio Emilia 2004), pp. 93–109. 
Saccani, Giovanni (1902). I vescovi di Reggio-Emilia, Cronotassi, Reggio Emilia: Tip. Artigianelli 1902.  (pp. 105–108)

15th-century Italian Roman Catholic bishops
Bishops appointed by Pope Eugene IV
1466 deaths